The Socialists' Party of Catalonia (PSC–PSOE official acronym) is a social-democratic political party in Catalonia, Spain, resulting from the merger of three parties: the Socialist Party of Catalonia–Regrouping, led by Josep Pallach i Carolà, the Socialist Party of Catalonia–Congress, and the Catalan Federation of the PSOE. It is the Catalan instance of the Spanish Socialist Workers' Party (PSOE), and its Aranese section is Unity of Aran. The party had also been allied with federalist and republican political platform Citizens for Change (Ciutadans pel Canvi) until the 2010 election. PSC–PSOE has its power base in the Barcelona metropolitan area and the comarques of Tarragonès, Montsià, and Val d'Aran.

Party leaders

First Secretaries
Joan Reventós, 1978–1983
Raimon Obiols, 1983–1996
Narcís Serra, 1996–2000
José Montilla, 2000–2011
Pere Navarro, 2011–2014
Miquel Iceta, 2014–present

Presidents
Joan Reventós, 1983–1996
Raimon Obiols, 1996–2000
Pasqual Maragall, 2000–2007
José Montilla, 2007–2008 (acting)
Isidre Molas, 2008–2011
Àngel Ros, 2014–2019
Núria Marín, 2019–present

Electoral performance

Parliament of Catalonia

Cortes Generales

European Parliament

See also
Unified Socialist Party of Catalonia
Socialist Party of Catalonia-Congress
List of political parties in Catalonia

Notes

References

External links

1978 establishments in Spain
Catalonia
Political parties established in 1978
Social democratic parties in Spain
Socialist parties in Catalonia